This is a list of launches made by the R-7 Semyorka ICBM, and its derivatives between 1995 and 1999. All launches are orbital satellite launches, unless stated otherwise.



References